Roderic Evans (born 19 January 1947) is a British retired singer known as a founding member of Deep Purple.

In the late 1960s, he began his professional career in The Maze, formerly MI5, after which he was a member of the original Deep Purple line-up, who produced three studio albums with a more progressive and pop-driven sound. After recording a solo single, he was a member of the original Captain Beyond line-up that produced two studio albums. Following a legal battle with Deep Purple in 1980, Evans has avoided publicity.

Early career
Evans was born in Eton, Buckinghamshire.
He "had been fronting groups since he was 17" and played together with drummer Ian Paice in The Maze, formerly MI5. He was also in a band called The Horizons in the mid 1960s.

Deep Purple

Evans and Paice were original members of Deep Purple when they formed in Hertfordshire in 1968. 

According to Deep Purple's founding bassist, Nick Simper, Evans was hired after "dozens" of other singers were auditioned; Evans clinched his place in the band after sharing an idea to rearrange the Beatles' song "Help!" as a ballad. This version of "Help!" was subsequently recorded for Deep Purple's debut album Shades of Deep Purple, but the most recognised song recorded with Evans on vocals is "Hush", a cover of a Joe South composition. "Hush" reached No. 4 on the US Billboard charts in October 1968. 

Deep Purple recorded only one other US Top 40 hit with Evans on vocals, that being a cover of Neil Diamond's "Kentucky Woman", which appeared on the band's second album and peaked at No. 38. Both "Hush" and "Kentucky Woman" are used in the Quentin Tarantino film, Once Upon a Time in Hollywood.

After recording three studio albums and one non-album single ("Emaretta") with Deep Purple, Evans was dismissed in the summer of 1969 while on tour in the U.S. It had been decided by Ritchie Blackmore, Jon Lord and Ian Paice that Evans' pop vocal style would not be suitable for the heavier hard rock sound the band wanted to achieve and move toward. Another factor in Evans' dismissal from Deep Purple was his desire to move to the United States.

Captain Beyond
In 1971, Evans recorded a solo single for Capitol, titled "Hard To Be Without You" (b/w "You Can't Love A Child Like A Woman"), then went on to form Captain Beyond, along with former Johnny Winter drummer Bobby Caldwell, former Iron Butterfly bassist Lee Dorman and guitarist Larry "Rhino" Reinhardt, who also was part of the last incarnation of Iron Butterfly.

Evans  left Captain Beyond and the music business after two albums. He then became a director of respiratory therapy at a western American hospital until 1980.

Deep Purple controversy and lawsuit

In 1980, Evans was approached by a management company that specialized in the unscrupulous and frequently legally-actionable practice of reforming groups with a minimum of original members, often in violation of trademark and contractual law. They offered him a chance to sing again under the Deep Purple name and he accepted. This "bogus Deep Purple", comprising none of the original Deep Purple members apart from Evans, made a couple of shows in Canada, Mexico and the US. After several shows ended in near-riots, management of the genuine Deep Purple, which had disbanded in 1976, successfully sued and were awarded damages. Also as a result, Evans stopped receiving royalties from the Mark I Deep Purple albums.

Later life
Evans has not appeared publicly since the 1980 court case and his current whereabouts are of considerable interest to fans of early Deep Purple. 

In 2015, Ian Paice said "If anyone knows where Rod is or even if he is still on the planet, that would be good news. We haven't had contact with him since the late 1970s. Nobody seems to know where the hell he is, or even if he is still alive. Not a clue."

In a 2015 interview, Captain Beyond drummer Bobby Caldwell mentioned that he was in touch with Evans, saying that Evans is "just doing fine these days" and had gone back to working in respiratory therapy for a long time.

On 8 April 2016, Evans was inducted into the Rock and Roll Hall of Fame as a member of Deep Purple, but despite being invited, he did not attend the ceremony.

Discography

Solo
It's Hard To Be Without You / You Can't Love A Child Like A Woman (1971), Single, Promo only

with Deep Purple
Studio Albums
Shades of Deep Purple (1968), US#24
The Book of Taliesyn (1968), US#54
Deep Purple (1969), US#162
Live albums
Inglewood – Live in California (2002)
BBC Sessions 1968–1970 (2011)
Compilations
Purple Passages (1972), US#57
Mark I & II (1973)
When We Rock, We Rock, and When We Roll, We Roll (1978)
The Anthology (1985), UK#50
The Deep Purple Singles A's and B's (1993)
Smoke on the Water: The Best Of (1994)
30: Very Best of Deep Purple (1998), UK#39, UK:Silver
Shades 1968–1998 (1999)
The Very Best of Deep Purple (2000), UK: Gold
Listen, Learn, Read On (2002)
The Early Years (2004)
The Platinum Collection (2005), UK#39
Deepest Purple: The Very Best of Deep Purple 30th Anniversary Edition (2010)
Singles
"Hush" (1968), US#4
"Kentucky Woman" (1968), US#38
"River Deep – Mountain High" (1969), US#53
"Emmaretta" (1969), US#128
DVDs
History, Hits & Highlights '68–'76 (2009)

with Captain Beyond
Studio albums
Captain Beyond (1972)
Sufficiently Breathless (1973), US#90
Lost & Found 1972-1973 (2017)
Live Albums
Live In Texas October 6, 1973 (2013)
Live Anthology Official Bootleg (2013)

References

External links
The Highway Star – Information from a Deep Purple fansite.

English male singers
English rock singers
1947 births
Living people
People from Eton, Berkshire
People from Slough
Captain Beyond members
Deep Purple members
20th-century English medical doctors
English songwriters
English expatriates in the United States
English male models